C-Block were a German Hip-Hop group, founded in 1995 by German music producers Frank Müller and Jörg Wagner. The group is fronted by American rapper/singer Anthony "Red Dogg" Joseph and James "Mr.P" White.

C-Block were a well-known hip hop act in Europe in the 1990s, who along with Down Low and Nana, signified the rise of the American-influenced rap music in Europe.

Biography
Since producer-driven, vocalist-fronted musical projects such as Snap! and C+C Music Factory had remarkable success in the early 1990s, producers Frank Müller, Ulrich Buchmann and Jörg Wagner decided to put together such a group in 1995.

The Persian Gulf War had ended in 1991 and former American soldiers who were stationed and based in Germany remained after their deployments and service in the armed forces ended. Some were musicians with musical ambitions. They now found themselves with the time and opportunity and were willing to try a musical career in Germany. Anthony "Red Dogg" Joseph and James "Mr.P" White met under such circumstances and were recruited by Frank Müller to become part of his newly created musical project.

They chose the name "C-Block" and released their debut single, "Shake Dat Azz", a collaboration with Chicago rapper A.K.-S.W.I.F.T. in late 1996, which made a lasting impression on their European fan base. However, their greatest hits were only ahead of them at the time. "So Strung Out", featuring Raquel Gomez-Rey, a more rap-oriented single, was released as their sophomore effort and catapulted the group to European superstardom. Based on a Soul Searchers sample, already made famous by Eric B. & Rakim and Run-DMC, called "Ashley's Roachclip", "So Strung Out" was a soulful ode to drug victims across the world and had a lasting impact in the European rap community.

Unfulfilled plans of a solo career made Mr.P leave the group in late 1997, being replaced by until then less visible project members and fellow compatriots Theresa "Misty" Baltimore and Preston "Goldie Gold" Holloway who had only recorded backing vocals and choruses for the C-Block debut album, General Population, released in 1997. They all quit the project after the more pop-oriented, less successful second album, called "Keepin' It Real".

Mr.P returned to the group and tried to make a comeback with newly recruited R&B singer Jeanine Love. The released singles failed to make an impact commercially or critically and the group officially disbanded in late 2000.

Frank Müller, one of the creators and producers of the group, released the group's third, shelved, album in late 2010 on the Internet.

New promo single F Base present's: Mr.P  "Here we Go" was released in 15.06.2019.

New demo single F Base feat Mr.P "Cool Breeze" released 08.03.2020

Discography

Singles

Albums

References

External links
booking: * http://www.urbano.cz
 C-Block at Discogs
 T-Music - www.euro-rap.com - European rap, hiphop & r&b

German hip hop groups